The Coca-Cola Bottling Company Building, also known as the Kelly Press Building, is a historic commercial building located on Hitt Street in downtown Columbia, Missouri.  It was built in 1935, and is a 1 1/2-story, Colonial Revival style brick building with a side gable roof with three dormers.  It has a long one-story rear ell. Today it houses Uprise Bakery, Ragtag Cinema (an independent theatre and staple of Columbia's cultural scene), Ninth Street Video, and Hitt Records.

It was listed on the National Register of Historic Places in 2006.

See also
 Coca-Cola Bottling Plant (Ocala, Florida)
 Elmira Coca-Cola Bottling Company Works

References

Manufacturing plants in the United States
Coca-Cola buildings and structures
Commercial buildings on the National Register of Historic Places in Missouri
Colonial Revival architecture in Missouri
Commercial buildings completed in 1935
Buildings and structures in Columbia, Missouri
National Register of Historic Places in Boone County, Missouri